In computing, a Self-organising heuristic is an algorithm that modifies a data structure such as a linked list in response to use of the data structure.

Examples might be:

 Move-to-front (or 'Move to top')
 Self-learning Frequency list (or 'Order by access frequency')
 Re-insert at random position
 Move to back

Example Applications
Move to front, or Order by access frequency, might be used to organize a cache of information, so that frequently used, or recently used information is at the top (and so can be found quickly, without having to traverse the whole list). 

Order by frequency might be used to re-arrange a list of options in a GUI menu, so that the top ones are the ones most commonly selected by the user.

Re-insert at random or Move to back might be used to organise a list of mirror servers, so that once a server has been used for downloading, it goes to the back of the queue, to discourage the user from selecting it again.

Heuristics